The 2016 Limerick Senior Hurling Championship was the 122nd staging of the Limerick Senior Hurling Championship since its establishment by the Limerick County Board. The championship began on 7 May 2016 and ended on 23 October 2016.

Na Piarsaigh were the defending champions, however, they failed to make it out of the group stage.

On 23 October 2016, Patrickswell won the championship after a 1-26 to 1-07 defeat of Ballybrown in the final. It was their first championship title since 2003 and a record-equalling 19th championship title overall.

Results

Group 1

Table

Group 2

Table

Knock-out stage

Quarter-finals

Semi-finals

Final

Championship statistics

Miscellaneous
Patrickswell win their first title since 2003.
Ballybrown qualify for the final for the first time since 1995.

References

Limerick Senior Hurling Championship
Limerick Senior Hurling Championship